Bonnie St. Claire (born Bonje Cornelia Swart, 18 November 1949) is a Dutch singer and actress who has a recording history that began in the 1960s and went through to the 1990s. She was part of the trio Bonnie, Debbie & Rosy, and part of the duo  with José Hoebee.

Life and career
St. Claire was born as Bonje Cornelia Swart in Rozenburg on 18 November 1949. She was born on a boat and is the daughter of a barge skipper. Her career began in 1966 when at a Peter Koelewijn concert, she was invited to come up on stage and sing with him.

In 1970 she had a hit with "I Won't Stand Between Them" which peaked at No. 6 in the Netherlands and spent eleven weeks in the charts. In 1979, she was part of a trio called Bonnie, Debbie & Rosy who released a single called "Oh Boy" which was written and produced by Peter Koelewijn. In addition to herself, the trio included Debbie aka Ria Schildmeyer, and Rosy Pereira.
She had a string of hits in the Netherlands, including Dokter Bernhard (1976), Pierrot (1980), Bonnie kom je buiten spelen (1980) and Vlieg nooit te hoog (1981). She also scored a hit with a translation of the Bette Midler song The Rose (song), translates as De Roos (1980).
Later St. Claire would join José Hoebee as part of the duo Bonnie & José and would have a degree of success in the Netherlands. The two singers were under the same management and they soon became friends and started socializing with each other. In 1984 they enjoyed a top 40 hit with "Cassandra" which had previously been recorded by ABBA. They also recorded an album of Abba songs which was approved by Björn Ulvaeus.

In 2010, St. Claire and Gerard Joling had a hit in the Netherlands with "Morgen Wordt Alles Anders" as Bonnie & Gerard. The song peaked at no. 2 and spent nine weeks in the charts.

References

External links
 "Herinnering" by Bonnie & José: 30th anniversary
 
 Bonnie St. Claire discography

1949 births
Living people
Dutch actresses
People from Rozenburg
20th-century Dutch women singers
20th-century Dutch actresses
Nationaal Songfestival contestants
21st-century Dutch women singers
21st-century Dutch singers